The Löwchen or  Little Lion Dog (German: Löwchen, "little lion"; French: Petit chien lion, "little lion dog") is a breed of small dog. The Löwchen once had the dubious distinction, like the Portuguese Water Dog and the Havanese, of being the rarest dog in the world. In 1973 there were only 65 registered examples of the breed. Even today, the breed generally has fewer than a few hundred new registrations each year worldwide.

Description 

The Löwchen is a compact companion breed with slightly off square proportions and balanced moderate angles in the front and rear. The silhouette of the breed calls for a long mane in the front with a flat topline. The Löwchen tail should be set coming off the topline and be over the back in the shape of a tea cup handle in movement.

The Löwchen's coat is long and flowing and comes in many colours. The coat should not be thin and fluffy like a Bichon Frise, but fairly straight with waves. It is a multi-texture coat with a 50/50 mix of silkier thicker hairs and softer hair. This allows for an easy to maintain coat that is silky to the touch. Löwchen coat should not be harsh, wooly or cottony. The Löwchen does not shed, and this breed has very low allergic effects, and are considered hypoallergenic. It is important to note, however, that there is no such thing as a completely hypoallergenic dog. The saliva and skin or dander, of a dog can still trigger an allergic event in sensitive people.

The head of the Löwchen is one of its most important features, with its relatively wide muzzle, broad skull, lively round eyes, and pendulant ears. They can come in all colours with dark pigmentation around the eye rings and nose. The head, when in proportion to the body, is neither too big nor too small, but helps to emphasize the friendly, regal, and leonine personality of the Löwchen. The litter size is usually between two to five puppies. The Löwchen's life span is around 14 to 18 years.

Lion cut 

 

The Löwchen's long and wavy coat can be presented in a lion cut. This means that the rear, back legs (except the hocks), front legs (except 1/2 bracelets around the forearm), and the 1/3–1/2 of the tail closest to the body are shaved, and the rest of the coat is left natural to give the dog the appearance of a male lion. The lion cut is the traditional way of presenting these dogs. It is speculated that the lion clip was to allow the naked areas to provide warmth to their owners while the long coat would collect lice and nits from their owners. Dogs in lion clip may need some protection in wintertime on the shaved parts.

Colour 
Löwchen can come in a variety of colors, and their colors can change throughout their lives. Many that are born dark will lighten up into cream or silver. You will also find a variety of colors within a single litter. Common colors are sable, silver, cream, white, parti, Irish pied, chocolate, and red/gold. A less common color is brindle. The American Kennel Club standard does not give preference to any color.

Temperament
The Löwchen is a friendly, healthy, and happy dog. Dogs of this breed are both active and playful, and very intelligent. The Löwchen is an excellent house pet.  The Löwchen makes also a good pet for families with children. This breed has a history as a companion dog and the dogs need the attention of humans and they are not happy left alone for longer periods of time. The Löwchen can be vocal in excitement or demands, though some can be quiet.

Health
The Löwchen is a robust breed with few health issues that impact the dog. Yearly eye exams, patella evaluation, and hip conformation evaluations are recommending for breeding stock. The breed can be impacted by Progressive Retinal Atrophy (PRA) and luxating patellas, however the frequency is low. Other issues tend to be issues related to old age.

History
The breed is found in many countries as far back as the sixteenth century. The little 'lion dog' is seen in many art pieces featuring dogs as far back as the sixteenth century, but it is unclear whether these were all dogs like the Löwchen, or simply small dogs of the Bichon type that were trimmed in a lion cut. Although this dog may be related to the Bichon Frise, the Löwchen's history remains obscure.

The Löwchen has a history as a companion dog to the wealthy and elite. It is possible to trace the modern history of the breed to late-19th-century enthusiasts in what are now Belgium, Germany and the Netherlands. It is thought the breed's ancestors were dogs that were brought in by travelers from the far eastern lands of Tibet and mingled with local dogs such as Spitz and terrier-type dogs. Occasionally a genetic throw-back is found.  Madame Bennerts started a breeding program in 1944, later with the help of veterinarian Dr. Rickert.

Lowchen were imported into Britain in 1968 and the breed was accorded Kennel Club (UK) recognition in 1971.  The Lowchen would finally make an appearance in America in 1971, by way of England.  At this time, the Löwchen was still known as the “Little Lion Dog”.  Also in 1971, The Löwchen Club of America (LCA) was formed and the breed's name was officially changed to “Löwchen ”. The Lowchen was accepted into the American Kennel Club Miscellaneous class in 1996, and then fully recognized into the non-sporting group in 1999.

The number of Lowchen worldwide continues to fall with the breed being listed as at risk for extinction. An effort to keep the breed from becoming extinct was started along with efforts across other rare breeds.

See also

 Dogs portal
 List of dog breeds

References

External links
 Löwchen World
 Löwchen Club of Canada
 Löwchen Club UK
 Löwchen Club of America

FCI breeds
Companion dogs
Rare dog breeds
Toy dogs
Dog breeds originating in Germany
Dog breeds originating in France
Bichon